The Country Mouse is a 1914 American comedy silent film written and directed by Hobart Bosworth. The film stars Hobart Bosworth, Adele Farrington, Myrtle Stedman, Marshall Stedman and Rhea Haines. The film was released on November 23, 1914, by Paramount Pictures.

Plot

Cast 
Hobart Bosworth as Billy Bladerson
Adele Farrington as Addie Balderson
Myrtle Stedman as Myrtle Marshall
Marshall Stedman as George Marshall
Rhea Haines as Madame Pauline

References

External links 
 

1914 films
1910s English-language films
Silent American comedy films
1914 comedy films
Paramount Pictures films
American black-and-white films
American silent feature films
1910s American films